Atibadi Jagannath Das Samman is a literary award awarded by Odisha Sahitya Akademi to an Odia language litterateur for lifetime contribution to Odia literature. This is the most respectable honor to any litterateur by the academy. This award is named after 15th century Odia poet Atibadi Jagannath Das who was also known as Atibadi (greatest). Started in 1993, the first award was given to Odia poet Radha Mohan Gadanayak. As of 2020, 28 awards have been awarded.

List of awardees

References

Awards established in 1993
Indian literary awards
Odia-language literary awards